Gour Chandra Bala (died 2005) was a Bangladesh Awami League politician and minister in the East Pakistan government.

Career
Bala was elected to the Constituent Assembly of Pakistan on 25 March 1954 from Faridpur North-East. He was the Minister of Food of East Pakistan in 1958.

Death
Bala died on 18 June 2005.

References

Awami League politicians
2005 deaths
Pakistani MNAs 1955–1958
Bangladesh Krishak Sramik Awami League central committee members